Space Rogue is a space flight simulation video game developed by Origin Systems and published by Origin Systems, Wave Brain, and Night Dive Studios. The game was released in 1989 for Apple II and Commodore 64; the series was later ported to DOS, Macintosh, Amiga, and Atari ST. The game was also released in the Japanese language for PC-9801, X68000, and FM Towns. The FM Towns version had its intro remade with slight animations and new illustrations, along with scrolling Japanese text, and exclusive CD quality background music. Taking place within the Far Arm of the Milky Way galaxy, Space Rogues main story revolves around the player characters efforts to pursue a career and undertake long-range goals beyond his immediate mission.

The game features elements of a role-playing game, like the much later X Rebirth and Elite Dangerous. It is notable for being the first game designed for Origin by Paul Neurath, who went on to found Blue Sky Productions (later renamed Looking Glass Studios).

Space Rogue can be considered as the spiritual predecessor to Origin's Wing Commander series. The press release for Space Rogue stated that it is "the first of its kind in science-fiction/3D space flight simulation. An ORIGIN Cinematic Experience", implying that Space Rogue was originally meant to be a series of its own ('Ultima in Space'), before later on Origin turned to the Wing Commander series instead. In 2016, Night Dive Studios reacquired the rights and re-released it.

Plot 
The player takes on the role of a crew member aboard the Princess Blue, who was sent by his captain to investigate a small derelict spacecraft, the Sunracer class Jolly Roger. While he is on board the Jolly Roger, a group of aliens called the Manchis attack the Princess Blue using their Vulture class ships, destroying it.

Left only with the Jolly Roger, little money, and no ties to anyone, the player can decide his fate from there. He could engage in piracy, hunt bounties, become an interstellar merchant, or become embroiled in the interplanetary politics.

Gameplay 
The game is played switching back and forth between a traditional top-down style role-playing game (e.g. Ultima) and a 3D space combat simulator (e.g. Elite). Visiting starships, space stations, outposts, planets, and so on. The player is able to travel from one solar system to another using the ancient Malir Gates' wormhole, a form of 'Star Gate'. A minigame of travelling through rings must be successfully completed before the player can reach his intended system; a failed minigame will cause an aborted interstellar travel.

During the 3D space flight part of the game, the game offers 3 points of view: first person, third-person, and cinematic.

There is also an arcade game called "Hive!" in the bars, that can be played by the player. The gameplay is a 2D top-down shooter, with the player moving on foot, attacking the incoming Manchis. The ship in the arcade game resembled the Sunracer class ship featured in the manual that came with Space Rogue. After completing five levels, the player can win money which can then be spent in the rest of Space Rogue.

Reception 

Computer Gaming World called Space Rogue "an interesting blend of arcade action, role-playing interaction and economic strategy." 

In the January 1990 edition of Dragon, Patricia Hartley and Kirk Lesser called it "a refreshing science-fiction game with crisp graphics that give you the feeling of flying in space." They concluded by giving it a rating of 3.5 out of 5, saying that it was "an enjoyable adventure that offers a lot of action for a minimal investment." 

Compute! stated that, "the best of flight simulation and role-playing come together in Space Rogue ... believably and with style." 

Zzap64, Issue #58, 1990: "I thought Elite could never be beaten as the greatest ever space game, but after playing Space Rogue for hours on end I've changed my mind. This totally outclasses Elite and is the best Space Game for any machine!"

In the June 1990 edition of Games International, Mike Siggins was very disappointed in this game, calling it "an almost exact lift of Elite." He concluded by giving it a very poor rating of 2 out of 10, saying "Save your money and stick with the original."

References

Sources

External links
 
 Space Rogue at Hall of Light
 Space Rogue at Atari Mania
 Space Rogue at GameFAQs
 

1989 video games
Adventure games set in space
Amiga games
Apple II games
Atari ST games
Commodore 64 games
DOS games
FM Towns games
NEC PC-9801 games
X68000 games
Origin Systems games
Role-playing video games
Science fiction video games
Space trading and combat simulators
Video games developed in the United States